Helms Alee is an American rock band that formed in 2007. Based in Seattle, Helms Alee features Ben Verellen, former member of Harkonen and Roy. Helms Alee has released six albums, Night Terror (2008) and Weatherhead (2011) through Hydra Head Records, and Sleepwalking Sailors (2014), Stillicide (2016), Noctiluca (2019) and  Keep This Be the Way (2022) through Sargent House (to which the band signed in 2013 ).
"Helms Alee" is a nautical term, included in the commands for tacking a sailboat.

Band members
 Dana James – bass guitar, backing vocals (2007-present)
 Hozoji Matheson-Margullis – drums, vocals (2007-present)
 Ben Verellen – guitar, vocals (2007-present)

Discography
Studio albums
 Night Terror (2008, Hydra Head)
 Weatherhead (2011, Hydra Head)
 Sleepwalking Sailors (2014, Sargent House)
 Stillicide (2016, Sargent House)
 Noctiluca (2019, Sargent House)
 Keep This Be the Way (2022, Sargent House)

Extended plays and splits
 Helms Alee (2007, Rome Plow)
 All About Friends Forever: Volume 4 (2013, independent)
 Helms Alee / Ladder Devils (2013, Brutal Panda)
 Helms Alee / Tacos! (2013, Violent Hippy)
 Helms Alee / Young Widows 12" (2014, Sargent House)

Singles
 "Lionize" / "Truely" (2008, Hydra Head)

References

External links 
 Helms Alee at Bandcamp
 Helms Alee discography at Discogs
 Helms Alee discography at Rate Your Music

Musical groups from Seattle
American sludge metal musical groups
American noise rock music groups
American post-hardcore musical groups
Musical groups established in 2007
2007 establishments in Washington (state)